Hidari bhawani, the veined palmer, is a butterfly of the family Hesperiidae. The species was first described by Lionel de Nicéville in 1889.

References

Hidari (skipper)
Butterflies described in 1889